Radio Helderberg is a community radio station situated in the Helderberg basin area of the Western Cape, South Africa. They broadcast on FM at a frequency of 93.6 MHz and the only one located in Somerset West area.

History
Radio Helderberg went on air at 06h00 on 1 July 1995, broadcasting on the frequency of 95.9FM from Southey Vines, Somerset WestThe first announcer on air was Martin Bailie, previously a breakfast DJ on a national commercial radio station, 5FM. He now presents an afternoon show on BBC Radio Cornwall. Other presenters making up the first day's schedule were Keren Bracey, Andre Michael & Nik Blundell. The value of this fledgling community radio station was first illustrated during a fire at the nearby AECI chemical plant in 1995, when clouds of poisonous gas enveloped Somerset West and Macassar. The volunteer presenters continued to broadcast throughout the night, becoming the central drop-off point for food and clothing donations, and providing hints and tips to panicked listeners.

Initially broadcasting for 15 hours a day, the station broadcasts a wide range of MOR music, interviews and community notices in three languagesEnglish, Afrikaans and Xhosa, live 24 hours a day.

In September 1996 the station relocated to premises in the Somerset Mall from where the volunteer presenters and a full-time staff of six kept the station going. Radio Helderberg has grown from a charitable association to a business, flourishing on advertising income only.

At the end of January 2004, Radio Helderberg once again relocated to Garden Pavilion in the Somerset West Business Park. With listeners from every corner of the basin and beyond and has become a business which continues to be there for the community to support them in their endeavors and to entertain, educate and inform.

Finally the studio then relocated to its current address inside the Sanctuary Shopping Centre in 2016.

It changed to stronger transmitter, now broadcasting on 93.6 MHz on the FM bad which reaches as far as the southern suburbs and Riviersonderend. Longtime presenters include Fanie Bam (deceased 2008), Erna Ridge, Nik Blundell, Neil Ovens aka "Lend 'n Ear", John Floyd, Kobus Schmidt, Mike Plummer (deceased 2007), Tommy Dell, Annelia Preiss, Marius Dippenaar and Eddy Carter-Smith.

In 2022, Radio Helderberg change the brand name to HelderbergFM 93.6 with in studio WhatsApp contact on +21 100 6936

Current Studio Location

The Studios are located at The Sanctuary Shopping Centre, corner R44 & De Beers Ave,  Somerset West.

Presenters (Permanent & Stand-in's)
Anele du Plessis
Bantu Landingwe
Barry Odendaal
Christie Hansen
Deon Strydom
Hanlè Barnard
Herman Stoop
Jan Snyman
Jan-Willem Lotz "JDubs"
Khaya Makuleni
Lindi Erasmus
LooE Swanepoel
Lunga Jakuja
Lunga Smile
Lydia Nikani
Mornè Mundey
Mzuthini Nkoyi
Olona Ndzuzo
Stephan van der Merwe
Vanessa Bourne
William Sigwinta

See also
 List of radio stations in South Africa

References

External links
 Official Radio Helderberg Website
 Helderberg Community Site
 South African Government

Somerset West
Afrikaans-language radio stations
Community radio stations in South Africa
Radio stations established in 1995
Mass media in the Western Cape